Khatib may refer to the following:
Khatib, an Islamic term for a person who delivers a sermon
Esmaeil Khatib (born 1961), Iranian cleric and politician
Khatib, Saudi Arabia, a village in Jizan Province, in southwestern Saudi Arabia
Khatib, Kerman, a village in Kerman Province, Iran
Khatib, Mazandaran, a village in Mazandaran Province, Iran
Khatib, Tabriz, a district in Tabriz
Khatib MRT station, a rapid transit station in Singapore